John Fingland Mason (born 15 May 1957) is a Scottish National Party (SNP) politician who has served as the Member of the Scottish Parliament (MSP) for Glasgow Shettleston since 2011.

He was previously the Member of Parliament (MP) for Glasgow East from 2008 to 2010, and a Glasgow City Councillor from 1998 to 2008.

Mason has been involved with charity work, and he is an accountant. He is a practising Christian and believes abortion should not be allowed for social reasons. He has attracted significant controversy for beliefs and comments which critics deemed to be transphobic and homophobic. He also faced significant criticism for keeping his SNP office open to the public during the COVID-19 pandemic lockdown, and for comments describing the Irish Republican Army as "freedom fighters".

Background
Originally from Rutherglen, Mason has lived in the East End of Glasgow for 20 years. His father was an electrical engineer, and his mother a teacher. After attending Hutchesons' Grammar School, he studied Accounting at the University of Glasgow, becoming an ICAS Chartered Accountant.

He worked for housing associations, nursing homes, and with a charity in London. He also spent three years in Kathmandu, Nepal, with an NGO (United Mission to Nepal) representing churches from across the world.

Councillor
Mason was elected as the councillor for the Garrowhill ward in Glasgow City Council at a by-election in 1998, and was re-elected in 1999 and 2003.

He rose to become the Leader of the Opposition in Glasgow City Council, and led the SNP Council Group on the majority Labour-run Council between 1999 and 2008. He was the SNP's longest-serving Glasgow councillor, and during his term, he led many protests against Labour's moves to weaken effective opposition by altering the council committee system.

In his ward, he attended a wide variety of community groups, including Garrowhill and Swinton Community Councils, local school boards, tenants association, and Garrowhill Action Partnership. He was also on the management committee of Tenant Controlled Housing, which aims to give local tenants control of their housing, in place of Glasgow Housing Association (GHA).

Parliamentarian

Member of Parliament
On 30 June 2008, David Marshall, Labour MP for Glasgow East, resigned from the UK Parliament on the grounds of ill-health, thereby triggering a by-election. The decision by Labour to call a quick by-election (set for 24 July 2008) was partly attributed to Labour's troubled finances and fears of an SNP campaign building up enough momentum. John Mason was selected as SNP candidate for Glasgow East on 3 July. During the by-election, the candidate stance on abortion was displayed on noticeboards in catholic churches; Mason was reported to be opposed to abortion occurring for social reasons.

Mason won the by-election in a surprise victory, defeating the Labour candidate Margaret Curran, MSP for Glasgow Baillieston. He overturned a Labour majority of more than 13,500 to win the seat on a swing of more than 22%. It was Labour's third-safest seat in Scotland.

Mason resigned his council seat immediately after his election as MP. Mason served as the SNP's Westminster spokesperson on Work and Pensions during his tenure as an MP. From 2009 until losing his seat in 2010, he also sat on the House of Commons' Select Committee on Administration.

In an interview with The Guardian newspaper in April 2010, when questioned about his Protestant religious beliefs, and how that could conflict with the rights of others in the UK, Mason acknowledged the difficulty that this issue raised with him, informing the newspaper that he had been warned to leave this issue alone by his party,

Mason was the last MP to ask a spoken question of a Labour Prime Minister, questioning Gordon Brown on a potential inquiry into corruption at Glasgow City Council at Brown's final PMQ’s on 7 April 2010.

Member of the Scottish Parliament 
In the 2011 Scottish Parliament election, he won the Glasgow Shettleston constituency with a majority of 586 votes.

Journalist and sketchwriter Alex Massie described him as, "the well-meaning creationist SNP member for Glasgow East... Mr Mason is a Holyrood treasure, a great entertainer in the long tradition of impressively bumbling backbenchers who add to the gaiety of parliamentary proceedings."

During the debate on same-sex marriage in Scotland, Mason was widely condemned for raising a motion stating that “while some in society approve of same-sex sexual relationships, others do not agree with them” and that no person or organisation should be forced to be involved or to approve of same-sex marriage. In February 2013, he wrote that he did not believe same-sex couples should have sex, on the grounds that, "the Bible is the word of God and its teachings are God’s direction as to how I should live my life. The Bible’s teaching is that a follower of Jesus should not have a sexual relationship with someone of the same sex.” In 2020 Mason returned to the question of gay sex, informing the Scottish Parliament whilst debating the Hate Crime Bill that the legislation would mean, "[Green party co-leader] Patrick Harvie and I can continue to debate who should or should not have sex with whom... That is a sign of a healthy society and a healthy democracy." The remark was criticised as "utterly bizarre".

In January 2015 he spoke in parliament in favour of teaching school children young Earth creationism, claiming that it cannot be "disproved by science".

In February 2016, he publicly asked "How is national debt different from national deficit?" on Twitter, prompting The Spectator to say that he "appears to lack a basic understanding of finance". He was re-elected in 2016.

In January 2017, he tweeted in the context of a second independence referendum that "Girls don't always say yes first time", leading to criticism that his comments were sexist and trivialised "rape culture" by Scottish Labour leader Kezia Dugdale, the Scottish Conservatives and the President of NUS Scotland, Vonnie Sandlan. Mason defended his comment as innocent and reflected the fact that "asking a girl for a relationship or to dinner, they don't always say yes the first time."

In February 2017, The First Minister of Scotland, Nicola Sturgeon apologised to the families of three Scottish IRA murder victims after Mason had claimed members of the terrorist organisation could be considered freedom fighters. Mason apologised for his comments after a meeting with the SNP's Scottish Parliament chief whip Bill Kidd.

In June 2017 Mason tweeted that, “learning times tables and spelling [were] stronger in my day but we have moved on”. He also wrote that, “Of course, reading and writing are very important. But if someone is a good surgeon and cannot spell, is that a problem?” and “What level of literacy is needed to have an IT career?” During a session of First Minister's Questions, Scottish Conservative leader Ruth Davidson asked Nicola Sturgeon whether she agreed with Mason; the First Minister declined to endorse his comments.

In May 2018, Mason was criticised for comparing the child sexual abuse by former Celtic F.C. employees to tax avoidance schemes.  Mason defended his comments.

Also in May 2018, Mason was contacted by a wheelchair user with concerns about the lack of accessibility to Celtic football club's stadium. Mason suggested that the fan support another team, a comment described as "outrageous" by Labour MSP James Kelly.

In June 2018 Mason responded to an email from a constituent that he did not agree with retrospective pardons for gay men convicted of having consensual sex before decriminalisation. He wrote, "I do not see that we can go round pardoning and apologising for everything that other people did that does not conform to modern customs. Will the Italians be apologising for the Roman occupation?" Mason was criticised for his "flippant tone".

In November 2018 he wrote a letter to The Herald newspaper to complain that transgender people "override science".

In September 2019, he tabled a motion called "Both Lives Matter", which called for abortion to be restricted.

In March 2020, he came under criticism for refusing to follow Scottish Government advice and keeping his parliamentary office open to the public during the COVID-19 pandemic. Fergus Mutch, a former SNP press officer, said of the controversy, "When I ran the SNP press office, I often felt I was defending the indefensible with John Mason. In the past, however, he’s only brought the party into disrepute. This time he’s risking lives. Typically stubborn and deeply arrogant.”

In May 2020, he came under fire for proposing a motion that the Scottish Parliament should "recognise the sacrifices" the armed forces make, the Parliament should "believe that some people use Armed Forces' Day to celebrate military might and power for the promotion of what considers to be an unhealthy British nationalism". Leading to criticism from opposition parties that it was "deeply disrespectful" to the armed forces. Mason defending his proposed motion stating: "I think my motion is clear in that I fully support the armed forces and am happy that we celebrate them."

He was re-elected in 2021 and used his victory speech to pledge that he would work on "issues around transgender."

In 2021, amid reports of a cleansing and vermin crisis in Glasgow, Labour MSP Pam Duncan-Glancy told Holyrood that there were even rats in her flat. Mason heckled her that, "There are rats in every street."

In October 2021, Mason received cross-party criticism for attending an anti-abortion protest outside the Queen Elizabeth University Hospital in Glasgow, for claiming that abortion services were rarely 'vital' and alleging that some women are 'coerced' into having abortions.

In January 2022 Mason referred to trans women as "people whose biological sex is male" and suggested that those convicted of crimes should serve their sentences in male prisons. Mason's remark was denounced as a "very shrill anti-trans dog whistle".

In May 2022, Mason tweeted that abortion clinics "push abortions without laying out the pros and cons". In June 2022, Mason told a constituent that he was "pretty positive" about the overruling of Roe v. Wade and the end of US-wide abortion rights. In response Scottish Government Minister for Women's Health, Maree Todd MSP wrote, "For the avoidance of doubt: There is nothing positive about the recent US court ruling. Abortion has been legal in Scotland for over 50 years." And Scottish Labour Women’s Health spokesperson, Carol Mochan, said: “It is sickening to see an SNP MSP gloating as millions of women losing access to vital healthcare." Also, in June 2022, Mason described abortion clinics as "conveyor belts".

In October 2022, Mason was criticised  by Labour MSP Paul Sweeney for his "insulting" response to a Glasgow-based homeless charity. Homeless Project Scotland had contacted Mason among several politicians looking for support for a safe indoor space to aid them during the winter months, Mason instead criticised the charity’s finances and asked them to "rent a building" instead of seeking assistance from local government, the charity accused Mason of continuing to "blast our charity" and claimed Mason had never responded to requests to visit them.

Personal life
Mason is single, a member of Easterhouse Baptist Church and a Clyde F.C. supporter.

References

External links
 
 Official Website
 

1957 births
Living people
Scottish National Party MPs
Members of the Parliament of the United Kingdom for Glasgow constituencies
UK MPs 2005–2010
Scottish accountants
People educated at Hutchesons' Grammar School
Scottish Baptists
Alumni of the University of Glasgow
People from Rutherglen
Baillieston
Members of the Scottish Parliament for Glasgow constituencies
Scottish National Party MSPs
Members of the Scottish Parliament 2011–2016
Christian Young Earth creationists
Members of the Scottish Parliament 2016–2021
Members of the Scottish Parliament 2021–2026